Armstrong Electric was a manufacturer of electric automobiles in Bridgeport, Connecticut.  The company was founded by inventor, William Armstrong, and produced cars from 1885 through 1902.

Present day
It was reported that the Maple Street factory used by Armstrong to build its first car could be used again used for automobile manufacture by AC Cars.

The original car has recently been rebuilt in England, and has run for the first time in over 100 years.  It is currently on show in a Victorian vehicle collection at a Sussex country park.

https://www.hemmings.com/blog/2016/03/14/perhaps-the-worlds-first-hybrid-an-1896-armstrong-sells-for-483400-at-amelia-island/

References

Electric vehicles introduced in the 19th century
Defunct motor vehicle manufacturers of the United States
Defunct companies based in Connecticut
Companies based in Bridgeport, Connecticut
Vehicle manufacturing companies established in 1885
Vehicle manufacturing companies disestablished in 1902
Vintage vehicles
1885 establishments in Connecticut
1902 disestablishments in Connecticut